Randall John Bryce (born December 9, 1964) is an American ironworker, activist, and former political candidate. He was the Democratic Party nominee for Wisconsin's 1st congressional district in the 2018 midterm elections. Bryce has been nicknamed "IronStache" due to his former occupation and prominent mustache, a moniker which he adopted for his Twitter account.

Early life
Born in Milwaukee, Bryce was raised in South Milwaukee. He is of Mexican and Polish descent. His mother worked in a doctor's office and his father was a police officer: he has a brother who is also a policeman and a sister who is a teacher. Bryce briefly attended college at the University of Wisconsin, Milwaukee, but did not receive a degree and served in the Army after graduation from high school, obtaining the rank of sergeant.

Political career
According to Politifact, Bryce' 2018 House campaign was his 4th run for office in 6 years. Bryce ran for state Assembly in 2012, losing in the Democratic primary  30% to 70%. Bryce and nine others ran for Racine School Board in 2013, but he failed to get in the top six and move on to the general election. In 2014, Bryce ran for state Senate and was defeated 39% to 61% by a Republican who formerly held the seat.

2018 congressional campaign

Bryce launched his campaign in mid-2017, originally to challenge incumbent Paul Ryan, the former Speaker of the United States House of Representatives and the congressional representative for Wisconsin's 1st since 1999. However, in April 2018 Ryan announced that he would not seek reelection. Bryce was persuaded to run for Congress by Marina Dimitrijevic, the Wisconsin director of the Working Families Party. The congressional campaign was launched with a widely watched announcement ad released in July 2017. In the ad, Bryce discusses his cancer and his mother's multiple sclerosis and the associated costs. The spot raised approximately $430,000 for Bryce's campaign.

Bryce has been endorsed by Justice Democrats,  by Wisconsin politicians such as Chris Larson, JoCasta Zamarripa and Rob Zerban, as well as environmental activist Bill McKibben and U.S. Senator from Vermont Bernie Sanders.

During the campaign, Bryce raised millions from a viral campaign video. His campaign was marred with stories of past actions and legal troubles. According to the Milwaukee Journal Sentinel, in 2002, Bryce borrowed and failed to pay back $1,776 from his then-girlfriend for a car. A court ordered a lien against Bryce in 2004, but only once he was a candidate was the debt paid, by Democratic Party lawyer Jeremy Levinson. Then, in 2015 according to The New York Times and Bryce's own admissions, he paid for fake Twitter followers while, according to the Milwaukee Journal Sentinel failing to pay his court-ordered child support.

In February 2018, Bryce's campaign became the first to agree to a collective bargaining contract with the Campaign Workers Guild.

Bryce was defeated 55% to 42% by Republican Bryan Steil in the election held November 6, 2018.

Political positions
Bryce has supported the Fight for 15 movement and has stated he believes in providing a living wage to those working a full-time job. Personal experiences with cancer and times spent uninsured in part inspired Bryce to enter politics. He has supported single-payer healthcare and opposed Republican efforts to repeal the Affordable Care Act.

Bryce has also supported subsidizing the production of American steel, in part because of his personal experience of difficulties when welding Chinese steel, and is in favor of new stipulations on buying American products for government vehicles. Regarding the environment, he has supported a Green New Deal, no new pipelines, and prosecuting ExxonMobil for "lying to the public". He opposes the Trump travel ban and advocates the abolition of U.S. Immigration and Customs Enforcement, with the agency's "necessary" functions being transferred to other parts of the federal government.

Personal life 
After the Army, Bryce worked as an appliance deliveryman. After suffering from chronic pain for some time, Bryce was diagnosed with testicular cancer and was saved by an experimental treatment. Following his recovery, he became an ironworker after his mother tipped him off about an apprenticeship vacancy: among the job's benefits was health insurance, covering his necessary CT scans, lymph node dissections and regular checkups. Bryce currently lives in Caledonia, north of Racine.

Bryce has been arrested nine times for multiple reasons, including public protests, driving under the influence, and marijuana possession.

Bryce has two sons.

Electoral history

Wisconsin Assembly (2012)

| colspan="6" style="text-align:center;background-color: #e9e9e9;"| Primary Election

| colspan="6" style="text-align:center;background-color: #e9e9e9;"| General Election

Wisconsin Senate (2014)

| colspan="6" style="text-align:center;background-color: #e9e9e9;"| General Election

U.S. House (2018)

| colspan="6" style="text-align:center;background-color: #e9e9e9;"| Primary Election

| colspan="6" style="text-align:center;background-color: #e9e9e9;"| General Election

References

External links

Further reading

 
 
 
 
 

1964 births
American people of Polish descent
American politicians of Mexican descent
Candidates in the 2018 United States elections
Living people
People from Caledonia, Wisconsin
People from South Milwaukee, Wisconsin
Politicians from Milwaukee
United States Army soldiers
University of Wisconsin–Milwaukee alumni
Wisconsin Democrats